Killeglan is the name of two places in Ireland:

 Ashbourne, County Meath, a town, once called Killeglan
 A townland in County Roscommon – see List of townlands of County Roscommon